Julio Ortíz (born 18 July 1947) is a Guatemalan racewalker. He competed in the men's 20 kilometres walk at the 1968 Summer Olympics.

References

1947 births
Living people
Athletes (track and field) at the 1968 Summer Olympics
Guatemalan male racewalkers
Olympic athletes of Guatemala
Sportspeople from Guatemala City